Livin' in the Fast Lane is the fourth studio album by the American hip hop group The Sugarhill Gang, released in 1984 on Sugar Hill Records. And Reached No.82 R&B Chart

Track listing

Samples and notes
"Troy" samples "Mosquito", by West Street Mob

References

External links
 
 

The Sugarhill Gang albums
1984 albums